Sanchai and Sonchat Ratiwatana were the defending champions but only Sanchai Ratiwatana chose to defend his title, partnering Peng Hsien-yin. Ratiwatana lost in the first round to Masahiro Fukuda and Masamichi Imamura.

Marin and Tomislav Draganja won the title after defeating Joris De Loore and Luke Saville 4–6, 6–3, [10–4] in the final.

Seeds

Draw

References
 Main Draw
 Qualifying Draw

Keio Challenger - Men's Doubles
Keio Challenger
2017 Keio Challenger